

 
Jordanita chloros is a moth of the family Zygaenidae.

Distribution
It is found from southern France, Italy and south-eastern Switzerland through southern, central and eastern Europe to the Caucasus, Turkey, northern Syria and northern Iraq. It is also found in eastern Kazakhstan and southern Sibiria.

Description
The length of the forewings is 7.8–12.8 mm for males and 7.6–11.5 mm for females.

Biology
The larvae of subspecies chloros have been recorded feeding on Centaurea paniculata in France, Centaurea stoebe in Germany and Centaurea maculosa in Switzerland and northern Italy. In Austria and Hungary, the larvae feed on Centaurea scabiosa, Centaurea jacea and Centaurea triumfetti, while Carduus uncinutus, Carduus arabicus, Carduus salonitana and  Jurinea sordida are the food plants in Ukraine. Larvae of subspecies hades feed on Staehelenia uniflosculosa in Greece.

Pupation takes place in a white cocoon at the ground. Adults are on wing from mid-June to August.

Subspecies
Jordanita chloros chloros (Europe except the Balkan Peninsula)
Jordanita chloros hades (Alberti, 1970) (North Macedonia, Bulgaria and Greece)
Jordanita chloros haegeri (Alberti, 1973) (Caucasus)

Etymology
The name of the species is derived from the Greek χλωρός (meaning bright green).

References

C. M. Naumann, W. G. Tremewan: The Western Palaearctic Zygaenidae. Apollo Books, Stenstrup 1999,

External links
Lepiforum e. V.

Procridinae
Moths of Asia
Moths of Europe
Moths described in 1813